Alsophila glabra, synonym Cyathea glabra, is a species of tree fern native to Borneo, western Java, Sumatra and the Malay Peninsula, where it grows in lowland swamp forest and montane forest at an elevation of up to 1500 m. The trunk of this plant is erect and 2–4 m tall. Fronds are bi- or tripinnate and 1–2 m in length. Characteristically of this species, the lowest pinnae may be significantly reduced. The stipe is very dark and bears basal scales. These scales are dark, glossy and have a paler margin and fragile edges. Sori are produced in groups of one to three on fertile pinnule veins. They lack indusia.

Large and Braggins (2004) note that A. glabra is very similar to Alsophila gigantea and appears to form part of a complex that also includes Alsophila podophylla and Alsophila subdubia. Further study is needed to determine the nature of the relationship between these taxa.

References

glabra
Flora of Sumatra
Flora of Peninsular Malaysia
Flora of Borneo
Flora of Java